Geodermatophilus telluris is a Gram-positive and aerobic bacterium from the genus Geodermatophilus which has been isolated from arid sand near Vers Ourba in Chad.

References

Bacteria described in 2013
Actinomycetia